Several Canadian naval units have been named HMCS Levis after Lévis, Quebec.

  (I), a  commissioned on 16 May 1941 and torpedoed and sunk south of Cape Farewell on 19 September 1941.
  (II), a   commissioned on 21 July 1944 and decommissioned on 21 February 1946.

Battle honours
Atlantic 1941, 1944–45
Gulf of St. Lawrence 1944

References

 Government of Canada Ships' Histories - HMCS Levis

Royal Canadian Navy ship names